Hybridity Music, commonly referred to as Hybridity, is an independent Canadian record label.

History
Founded in Vancouver by Malcolm Levy in 2012, Hybridity is an artist-run label that works in the areas where performance, music, art, and technology cross over.

Their first release was the Traps EP by Vancouver duo Humans. The label was introduced by XLR8R with a video for the Max Ulis remix of "De Ceil."

Hybridity Music is part of a larger concept centring on trans-disciplinary art and collaborative practice. Hybridity is focused on artists who produce cross genre'd music and media that span installation, visual art, music, technology, and performance.

As an artist-run label, Hybridity supports music artists by handling their management, distribution, PR,  publishing, branding, and overall trajectory, improving their aesthetics through consultation, discussion, and implementation.

Hybridity regularly throws events and curates exhibitions in Vancouver and New York.

Artists past and present

 BCBG
 Calamalka
 Dreamboat
 Gang Signs
 Humans
 Ladyfrnd
 Michael Brock
 Monolithium
 Sabota
 Snowday
 Speaker Face
 Thomas Cade
 Wolfey

Discography
 HYB001: Humans - Traps EP (2012.03.06)
 HYB002: Calamalka - All the Way Up (2012.07.24)
 HYB003: Thomas Cade - Greenwich Mean Time (2013.02.15)
 HYB004: Humans - Nine Tenths single (2013.02.18)
 HYB005: Gang Signs - Remixes EP (2013.02.26)
 HYB006: BCBG - "Chappelle Abstraite" (2013.06.08)
 HYB007: Dreamboat – "Boy" (2013.06.01)
 HYB008: Ladyfrnd – "Ladyfrnd" (2013.06.15)
 HYB009: "Bass Coast 2013 Humans Remixed" (2013.12.11)
 HYB010: Wolfey - "Wolfey" (2013.11.26)
 HYB011: Sabota - "Sabota" (2014.02.21)

See also
 List of record labels
 List of electronic music record labels
 Hybridity
 Electronic music
 Indie electronic
 Intelligent dance music
 Techno

References

External links
 HybridityMusic.com – Official site
 Hybridity Music channel at YouTube
 @Hybridity at Twitter
 Hybridity at SoundCloud
 Hybridity Music at Discogs.com

Electronic music record labels
Canadian independent record labels
Record labels established in 2012